The Generation of Rage in Kashmir is a book written by the Indian journalist and author David Devadas, a former political editor at Business Standard. The book examines the rise of militancy in Kashmir and looks at the causes of anger among Kashmiri youth following the killing of Burhan Wani in 2016.

Reviews 
Praising the book, Kallol Bhattacherjee in The Hindu wrote that Devadas had produced a "great work".

References 

Books about the Kashmir conflict